Leonel Rocco Herrera (born 18 September 1966) is a Uruguayan football manager and former player who played as a goalkeeper.

Club career
Rocco spent most of his career in the Primera División Uruguaya, playing for Progreso, Nacional and Rampla Juniors. He also had a spell with Textil Mandiyú in the Primera División de Argentina.

International career
Rocco was selected as a member of the Uruguay national football team at the 1991 Copa América, but did not make an appearance for the team.

References

1966 births
Living people
Footballers from Montevideo
Uruguayan footballers
Association football goalkeepers
C.A. Progreso players
Textil Mandiyú footballers
Club Nacional de Football players
Rampla Juniors players
Tampico Madero F.C. footballers
C.A. Bella Vista players
Independiente Santa Fe footballers
Atlético Bucaramanga footballers
Independiente Medellín footballers
FBC Melgar footballers
C.A. Rentistas players
Uruguayan Primera División players
Argentine Primera División players
Ascenso MX players
Categoría Primera A players
Peruvian Primera División players
1991 Copa América players
Uruguayan expatriate footballers
Uruguayan expatriate sportspeople in Argentina
Uruguayan expatriate sportspeople in Colombia
Uruguayan expatriate sportspeople in Mexico
Uruguayan expatriate sportspeople in Peru
Expatriate footballers in Argentina
Expatriate footballers in Colombia
Expatriate footballers in Mexico
Expatriate footballers in Peru
Association football coaches
Uruguayan football managers
Club Plaza Colonia de Deportes managers
C.A. Progreso managers
Atlético San Luis managers
Defensor Sporting managers
Uruguayan Primera División managers
Liga MX managers
C.A. Rentistas managers
Uruguayan expatriate football managers
Uruguayan expatriate sportspeople in Ecuador
Expatriate football managers in Mexico